KWNE (94.5 FM, "K-Wine 94.5") is a radio station licensed to serve Ukiah, California, United States. The station, launched in 1968 as KLIL, is currently owned by the Broadcasting Corporation of Mendocino County.

KWNE broadcasts a Top 40/CHR music format.

The station was assigned the call sign KWNE by the Federal Communications Commission on July 2, 1979.

References

External links

WNE
Contemporary hit radio stations in the United States
Radio stations established in 1968
Companies based in Mendocino County, California